Gangarampur B.Ed College is a Bachelor of Education college in Kaldighi, Gangarampur in the Dakshin Dinajpur district of West Bengal, India. The college is affiliated to the University of Gour Banga and approved by National Council for Teacher Education (NCTE) offering Bachelor of Education courses. Its current president is Dr. Towhid-e-Aman.

IGNOU Study Center
Gangarampur B.Ed College has IGNOU study center (45010) to facilitate distance education approved by Indira Gandhi National Open University, New Delhi.

References

External links 
Gangarampur B.Ed College

Colleges affiliated to University of Gour Banga
Educational institutions established in 2005
Universities and colleges in Dakshin Dinajpur district
2005 establishments in West Bengal
Gangarampur
Colleges of education in India